Niulanshan Area is an area and a town in the northern siden of Shunyi District, Beijing, China. It shares border with Miaocheng and Yangsong Towns in its north, Beixiaoying Town in its east, Shuangfeng Subdistrict and Mapo Town in its south, and Zhaoquanying Town in its west. Its total population was 54,687 as of 2020.

History

Administrative divisions 

At the end of 2021, Niulanshan had direct jurisdiction over 26 subdivisions, including 6 communities and 20 villages:

Gallery

See also 

 List of township-level divisions of Beijing
 Niulanshan No.1 High School

References 

Shunyi District
Towns in Beijing
Areas of Beijing